Elevation is the fourth international studio album by Indonesian singer-songwriter, Anggun. The album was released with the same title for the English-language version and the French-language version. The album was certified Gold Export Award for its sales outside France.

Background
After a long year from "Luminescence" era, a third successful studio album, certified gold in France and abroad, the Indonesian singer feels more than ever. "I didn't, at all, feel like the weaker sex. Well, a woman is rich. We live more things psychologically and emotionally. We can do many things at once and we must be proud," said Anggun.

"Elevation" is a new ambitious project, which exposed the sensuality of Anggun on urban unexpected rhythms, produced by  Tefa & Masta (several songs are co-written by Diam's, Sniper, Sinik, Kool Shen, Rohff, and Sako) and including prestigious collaborations with Pras of the Fugees, Sinik, Big Ali, and also Tunisiano. "I appreciated the urban music but the world of hip-hop in me remains unknown," said Indonesian singer, referring to the period preceding his meeting with thunderbolt Tefa & Masta. "I was fan of the last album of Nelly Furtado, and I found her amazing musical evolution was successful. Surprise while continuing to provide what is expected of me. I like to cover their tracks as I did with DJ Cam for example."

In preparation for "Elevation", Anggun has worked hard in the studio for nearly two years, in an exceptional because at the same time she also gave birth to her daughter, Kirana. "Because of my situation, the album was built in the softness and serenity," said Anggun. "It was pretty easy for finally work together. It was initially chosen themes music loops that we finally created in the studio. Then we composed melodies. It was all new to me, I've never worked like this before. It was a big challenge and I love the final result."

Composition
Elevation became Anggun's first French release to be fully co-written by her. Anggun was assisted by Jmi Sissoko in writing and studio work. Together, they shared their values of integrity, respect, family and demand. "It was like a family, I've never experienced something so intense, such an understanding at personal and professional". Anggun then decided to employ members of her new musical family on her papers, including French rappers. The singer was surrounded by Tunisiano ("Plus Forte") and Sako dog Flaw ("Rien à écrire", "Si je t'emmène", "Tentation").

After the latter, a slameuse, Julie Grignon, who brought sweetness and candor to original title "J'ignorais tout", Anggun has even offered the prestigious collaborations with Pras of the Fugees and Big Ali, not to mention a participation with the guitarist Järvelä Bruno, a member of rock band French Indochina, on the original song "Plus forte". "Cette Nuit" expresses a voluptuous sensuality, "Si Tu L'avoues" offers a strong statement of love, "Le Temps Perdu" presents a painful admission of failure, while "Eden in Her Eyes" marks a break on a folk acoustic guitar in honor of her daughter, Kirana.

Track listing

French version

English version

Singles 
French singles
"Si Tu L'avoues" (First single from the album)
"Si Je T'emmene" (featuring Pras Michel)

International singles
"Crazy" (English version of "Si Tu L'avoues") - International first single
"My Man"
Singles released in Indonesia:
"Jadi Milikmu (Crazy)" - #1 in Indonesian Airplay Chart and #1 in Indonesian Singles Chart
"Berganti Hati" (Indonesian version of "No Song") - #10 in Indonesian Airplay Chart
"Sebelum Berhenti" (Indonesian version of "Seize the Moment") - #07 in Indonesian Airplay Chart and reached top 5 in many radio stations' charts in the region

Charts

Weekly charts

Certifications

Release history

References

2008 albums
Anggun albums
French-language albums
Hip hop albums by Indonesian artists
Heben Music albums
Warner Music France albums